Live Oak High School (LOHS) is a public high school in Morgan Hill, California. Designated as a California Gold Ribbon School in 2015, Live Oak is part of the Morgan Hill Unified School District.

History 

Live Oak Union High School was established in 1904.  Montgomery Hall was used to house the pupils for the first term.  Construction of the first permanent facilities were completed in 1905. At the organization of Live Oak Union, Highland, Burnett, San Martin, Machado and Morgan Hill rural school districts were included, and, in August, 1921, Coyote, Llagas and Uvas districts were added. The name was later changed to Live Oak High School after the Morgan Hill Unified School District was established, which combined the aforementioned rural elementary school districts.

In 1940 a new campus was built on the north side of town, along Monterey Street, between West Central Avenue and Keystone Avenue.  The main entrance was at 80 West Central Avenue.

The school was moved from West Central Avenue to its present location at 1505 East Main Avenue in the summer of 1975. The former campus on West Central Avenue was renamed and established as Lewis H. Britton Middle School.  Due to the establishment of Britton Middle School, from 1979 Live Oak High School consisted only of grades 10 through 12, but as of the autumn of 2004, it once again functions as a four-year high school.

Cinco de Mayo incident 
On May 5, 2010, five LOHS students arrived at school wearing T-shirts and bandanas bearing emblems of the American flag. The school's administrators sent home four of them for refusing to remove the T-shirts on the Pueblan holiday of Cinco de Mayo. School officials deemed the garments "incendiary" and "disrespectful," fearing that displaying the American flag would incite fights with the Mexican-American student body. The four students were told they could choose to change their clothes or go home for the day.

On May 6, approximately 200 Hispanic teens, most of whom were Live Oak High School students, walked out of their classes and  marched through the downtown and to city hall in protest of what they regarded as disrespect from their American-flag-wearing peers. The crowd carried Mexican flags and sported the red, white and green of Mexico's national emblem. Two days later, a crowd of students led by several Hispanic students gathered in the amphitheater and held an anti-racism rally advocating acceptance and tolerance among the students.

On May 10, the ACLU of Northern California sent a letter to the Morgan Hill Schools Superintendent protesting that the students' First Amendment rights had been violated and asking that the School District "take additional steps to inform students that their rights to free speech will be respected in the future".

On November 8, 2011 United States District Court for the Northern District of California Chief Judge W. James Ware of San Francisco dismissed the students' lawsuit.  While public school students have the right to engage in non-disruptive free speech, Chief Judge Ware found this "does not require that school officials wait until disruption occurs before they act".  The United States Court of Appeals for the Ninth Circuit in San Francisco affirmed the district court's ruling. The student’s final appeal to the United States Supreme Court was denied without comment.

Awards and rankings
Live Oak was designated as a California Gold Ribbon School in 2015.

Notable alumni 
Diego Barrios (Class of 2020), tuba player for Drum Corps International Championships 2022 winner, Blue Devils
Mike Do (Class of 2017), euphonium player for Drum Corps International Championships 2017 winner, Blue Devils
Jared Allen (Class of 2000), professional NFL player, attended Live Oak for two years, graduated from Los Gatos High School
Ricky Berry (Class of 1983), professional basketball player, played in the NBA for the Sacramento Kings
Hal Davis (1938) World class sprinter 1940 - 1945. American 100yd and 220 yd title holder. Ref. Hal Davis, sprinter, Wikipedia
Tom R. Ferguson (Class of  1978), World champion rodeo cowboy and inductee into the Rodeo Hall of Fame
Rhett Hall (Class of 1987), NFL player and of Super Bowl XXVIII champion
Ryan Neufeld (Class of 1994), NFL football player for the Dallas Cowboys (1999), Jacksonville Jaguars, Seattle Seahawks, and Buffalo Bills
Rey Sánchez (Class of 1986), exchange student from Puerto Rico to Live Oak High in 1985, Major League Baseball Player
Bob Stoddard (Class of 1975), baseball player who played for the Seattle Mariners, Detroit Tigers, San Diego Padres and Kansas City Royals
Jeff Ulbrich (Class of  1995), NFL linebacker
Jimmy Vasser (Class of 1983), race car driver, 1996 CART Champion, Indycar Team Owner, 2013 Indy 500 Champion Team Owner (Driver-Tony Kanaan)

References

External links 
liveoak.mhusd.org
www.maxpreps.com — Live Oak Acorns intramural sports calendar (Warning: Generates numerous pop-ups)
Emerald Regime Band

High schools in Santa Clara County, California
Public high schools in California
1904 establishments in California
Educational institutions established in 1904